Makerwal (مکڑوال) is a village of Mianwali District in the Punjab province of Pakistan.

Makerwal is located in Isakhel Tehsil at 32°51'26.8N 71°11'21E. The language of town is Pashto. There are many sub branches in Makerwal like, Bahi Darsal, Khatak, Doulat Khel, Heedar, Chechar Khel Sanjar khel, Pahar Khel, Hindal Khel, Zangi khel.

Makerwal has various natural resources and minerals such as coal, silica, sand and iron ore. The main source of income is coal, transport and fisheries. Mine Survey Institute of Makerwal is well known institute of Pakistan. Makerwal and Sultan khel surveyors are famous in Pakistan and overseas.

References

Populated places in Mianwali District